Promotional Copy is the second studio album by American rock band Reggie and the Full Effect.

History
Promotional Copy was recorded and released in 2000. Produced by Ed Rose, it was the follow-up to the band's debut album Greatest Hits 1984-1987. Due to the misleading nature of the title, several retailers including Best Buy and Sam Goody sent back entire shipments of the album, because they believed that they were actually sent promotional copies of the album rather than the album itself.

Caption on the inner cover

Track listing

Personnel
Matt Pryor - guitar, backing vocals
Rob Pope - bass
James Dewees - drums, lead vocals, keyboards
Ed Rose - Production, Mixing

References

2000 albums
Reggie and the Full Effect albums
Albums produced by Ed Rose